Seefingan often spelt Seafingan ( meaning Fingan's Seat) is a mountain that straddles two county boundaries from its summit in Wicklow eastwards down into South Dublin, in Ireland. There are extensive views from the summit and there is a large megalithic cairn nearby.

Geography 
At  Seefingan is the 11th highest summit in the Wicklow Mountains, the second highest point in South Dublin after Kippure and the 92nd highest summit in Ireland. It stands at the junction of three ridges, Corrig to the north, Seefin to the southwest and Kippure to the east, and straddles the border between County Wicklow and South Dublin. The headwaters of the River Dodder lie on the eastern slopes of Seefingan, Kippure and Seecawn.

The summit is a smooth grassy area but the three ridges are boggy, and particularly difficult to negotiate after rain. There are footpaths but they can be difficult to follow through the boggy parts; a Seefin – Seefingan – Kippure circuit is one possible route. There is not a cairn on the summit, but there is a notice warning walkers of Kilbride Camp and the nearby military firing range. There are extensive views to the mountains of western Wicklow, Mullaghcleevaun and Poulaphouca Reservoir, the prominent communication masts on the top of Kippure and across the city of Dublin towards Howth. A few hundred yards west of the summit lies a large megalithic cairn, which probably marks the site of a collapsed passage tomb. There is also a trig point here.

See also
 List of mountains in Ireland

References

Mountains and hills of County Wicklow
Hewitts of Ireland
Mountains and hills of South Dublin (county)
Mountains under 1000 metres